Kunvald is a market town in Ústí nad Orlicí District in the Pardubice Region of the Czech Republic. It has about 900 inhabitants.

Administrative parts
Villages of Bubnov, Končiny, Kunačice, Záhory and Zaječiny are administrative parts of Kunvald.

Geography
It lies in the Podorlická Uplands. The Horský Brook flows through the market town.

History

The first written mention of Kunvald is from 1363. It was founded in the second half of the 13th century.

The Moravian Church was founded in Kunvald in "Na Sboru" House in 1457, when followers of the martyred Jan Hus found refuge on the estate of King George of Poděbrady.

Sights
"Na Sboru" House is open to the public and contains an exposition on the history of the Moravian Church (Unity of the Brethren). Other memorable places, reminiscent of the work of the Moravian Church, are the Brethren Linden, which was planted here by members before leaving their homeland; a place called Jordán, where there used to be a well where the new members were baptized; a praying mine where the brothers hid and gathered for worship in times of oppression; a monument to John Amos Comenius from 1910, which stands in the original burial ground; and a smithy, from which the first bishop of the Unity allegedly came.

Notable people
Jan Černý-Nigranus (c. 1500–1565), historian and priest

Twin towns – sister cities

Kunvald is twinned with:
 Lititz, United States

References

External links

Market towns in the Czech Republic
Populated places in Ústí nad Orlicí District
History of the Moravian Church